The Woo Ju Memorial Library (和如紀念圖書館) is a library in the grounds of Chuang Yen Monastery in Kent, Putnam County, New York, United States, run by the Buddhist Association of the United States (BAUS). It selects publications under the categories “Buddhism” and “Mind, Spirit, and Health” on a regular basis, so as to showcase the library collection. Loan, references, and library tour services are also provided.

History
The Library was founded by C.T. Shen to commemorate his wife, Woo Ju Shen, for her two decades of service propagating Buddhism. It currently holds over seventy thousand volumes on Buddhist topics.

Since mid-2010 to the present, the Library has held close to twenty Dharma talks in English. BAUS has invited scholars, authors, professors and other experts from different fields to enrich their audience's awareness and understanding of Buddhism and the Buddhist lifestyle.

Lecturers have included:

Dr. Dan Lusthaus - Professor at Harvard University and expert on Yogācāra
Dr. Weijen Teng - Professor at Dharma Drum Institute of Liberal Arts
Dr. Chun-fang Yu - Professor at Columbia University 
Dr. Paul Fulton - Pioneer psychologist at Harvard University
Dr. Russell Leong - Chief Editor of Amerasia Journal at UCLA
Dr. James Carter - Professor at Saint Joseph's University
Dr. Tzung Kuen Wen - Professor at Dharma Drum Institute of Liberal Arts
Bhikkhu Bodhi - Buddhist monk and Pali scholar
Dhammadipa Sak - Abbot of Chuang Yen Monastery
Many others

These lectures covered various topics such as the Buddhist textual canon, the doctrine of karma, mythical narratives and practices of bodhisattvas, the scientific development of meditation and psychology, the search of Truth; Buddhist views and involvement in secular affairs, and many other subjects.

Since October 2012, the library has held a “Mind over Movie” series on the first Saturday of each month. Movie discussion is led by Professor Russell Leong to discuss Buddhist concepts in films. Contemporary films such as Awake: The Life of Yogananda, Spring, Summer, Fall, Winter... and Spring, and Zen have been screened with Buddhist themes elaborated upon. The library has provided a communication platform for shared understanding in the quest for life.

The library divides its collection into six areas: Loaned, Multimedia, Reference, Periodical and Magazine, BAUS publication, Youth and Children.

References

External links
  (English)
 和如紀念圖書館 (Mandarin)
 Facebook page

Libraries in New York (state)
Buddhist libraries